Itea ilicifolia, the holly-leaved sweet spire, is a species of flowering plant in the family Iteaceae, native to western China. It is hardy, though young plants require protection from dry winds.

This plant has gained the Royal Horticultural Society's Award of Garden Merit.

References

Flora of China
Saxifragales
Taxa named by Daniel Oliver